A significant number of British Rail Class 47 locomotives have been preserved on heritage railways, the current total standing at 31 as of January 2020.
Five locomotives (47 270, 47 580, 47712, 47 773 and 47 828) are mainline registered and as such may operate on Network Rail.
Locomotives that do not currently carry their names are shown with the name in brackets.

Preserved examples

See also
 List of preserved British Rail diesel locomotives

References

47
Brush Traction locomotives
British Rail Class 47
British Rail Class 47